The Home Team Volunteer Network (HTVN) is a volunteer organisation in Singapore.

It was launched by Deputy Prime Minister/Minister for Home Affairs, Mr Teo Chee Hean, at the Home Team Convention on 15 July 2011. The Network is an entity that promotes the implementation of volunteer management best practices for the benefit of Home Team volunteers and is also the key channel through which the Ministry of Home Affairs engages its volunteers. The HTVN comes under the ambit of the Ministry of Home Affairs and does not raise funds from the public for whatever purposes.

The Steering Committee

The Steering Committee of the HTVN is an advisory body on Home Team volunteer matters.

The Steering Committee is appointed by the Minister for Home Affairs for a 2-year term or as otherwise specified, and comprises both Home Team key appointment holders as well as existing Home Team volunteers. As of March 2012, the current members are:

Chairman
A/P Ho Peng Kee

Deputy Chairman
Mr Tan Tee How, Permanent Secretary, Ministry of Home Affairs

Members

Ministry
Mr Tai Wei Shyong, Deputy Secretary (Operations) 
Mrs Ong-Chew Peck Wan, Director, Community Engagement Division

''Home Team DepartmentsMr Hoong Wee Teck, Commissioner of Police

Mr Eric Yap Wee Teck, Commissioner Singapore Civil Defence Force

Mr Soh Wai Wah, Director Singapore Prison Service
 
Mr Ng Ser Song, Director Central Narcotics Bureau

Mr Teo Tze Fang, CEO SCOREHome Team Volunteers''
Mr Eric Low

Mr Kong Mun Kwong

Home Team Volunteer Schemes

Home Team Volunteers broadly refer to people who volunteer in a volunteer scheme within the Ministry of Home Affairs (Singapore), or MHA for short.

Home Team Volunteers are classified by the Ministry under two broad categories. They either serve as members of its Boards, Councils and Committees, known also as the Home Team Connection, or as volunteers within one of its departments. The departments that currently have volunteers are the Singapore Police Force, the Singapore Civil Defence Force, the Singapore Prison Service and the Singapore Corporation of Rehabilitative Enterprises, otherwise known as SCORE. Strictly speaking however, it is worth noting that SCORE is not a department but a Statutory Board under the Ministry of Home Affairs.

Home Team Connection

Advisory Committee for Move On and Filming Orders
Anti-Inhalant Abuse Centre Review Committee
Board of Visitors (Drug Rehabilitation Centres and Anti-Inhalant Abuse Centres)
Board of Visiting Justices and Board of Inspection
Casino Regulatory Authority Board
Citizenship Committee of Inquiry
Criminal Law Advisory Committees (Hearing)
Criminal Law Advisory Committee (Review)
Criminal Law Review Board
Drug Rehabilitation Centres Review Committees
Employment Release Selection Committee
Fire Safety Appeals Advisory Board
Home Detention Advisory Committees
HomeTeam NS Board of Governors
Home Team Volunteers Network
Industrial and Services Co-operative Society Ltd
Institutional Discipline Advisory Committees
Institutional Discipline Review Committees
INVEST Board of Trustees
INVEST Committee
Liquors Licensing Board
Medical Advisory Committee
National Council Against Drug Abuse
National Crime Prevention Council
National Fire and Civil Emergency Preparedness Council
National Police Cadet Corps Council
Reformative Training Centre Advisory Committee
Singapore Corporation of Rehabilitative Enterprise Board
Singapore Road Safety Council
The Life Imprisonment Review Board
The President’s Pleasure Review Board

Departmental Volunteer Schemes

Singapore Police Force
Crime Prevention Ambassadors (CPA)
National Police Cadet Corps (NPCC)
Neighbourhood Watch Zones (NWZ)
Volunteer Special Constabulary (VSC)

Singapore Prison Service
Prison Volunteers

Singapore Civil Defence Force
CD Lionhearters Club
Civil Defence Auxiliary Unit (CDAU)
Civil Defence Crisis Volunteers
National Civil Defence Cadet Corp (NCDCC)

Singapore Corporation of Rehabilitative Enterprises (SCORE)
Yellow Ribbon Project Volunteers

Other Programmes
Community Engagement Programme (CEP)
Community Safety and Security Programme (CSSP)

See also
 Volunteer Special Constabulary
 Civil Defence Auxiliary Unit
 Yellow Ribbon Project

References

External links
 
 Ministry of Home Affairs
 Home Team News

Organisations of the Singapore Government